Congewai is a settlement in New South Wales, Australia.

Education 
There is one co-ed government primary  school called Congewai Public School on 605 Congewai Road.

Population 

In 2011 the population was 254 with a median age of 50. 76.8% of the residents were born in Australia, 6.3% England, 1.6 Wales, 1.2 Scotland, 1.2% Sweden and 1.2% Trinidad and Tobago. Their religious affiliations were recorded as 36.0% Anglican, 22.5% No Religion, 14.2% Catholic, 4.3% Presbyterian and 4.3% Uniting Church.

References

Towns in the Hunter Region
Towns in New South Wales
Suburbs of City of Cessnock